Herman Lintvelt (born 6 September 1976 in Windhoek) is a Namibian rugby union player. He is a member of the Namibia national rugby union team and participated with the squad at the 2007 Rugby World Cup. He made his test debut against Ivory Coast in Casablanca on 12 September 1998. His last test was against Argentina in Marseille on 22 Sept 2007.

References

1976 births
Living people
Namibia international rugby union players
Namibian rugby union players
Rugby union players from Windhoek
Rugby union props